Bangor Christian Schools (BCS) is a K-12 Christian school in Bangor, Maine.

History
The school began operations in 1970. In 2004 it had 117 high school students and 235 elementary and middle school students.

Prospective parents were plaintiffs in Carson v. Makin.

The Office of the Attorney General of the State of Maine in 2021 stated that the school does not employ LGBTQ teachers and the school culture discourages students from expressing LGBTQ identities, with the possibility that the school may expel students for doing so.

Operations
The annual tuition in 2004 was $2,900 per year per pupil, and at the time the state did not provide any funds, nor did the federal government.

Curriculum
Its elementary school curriculum promotes phonics at early stages.

Athletics
It is a part of the Penobscot Valley Conference.

References

External links
 

Christian schools in Maine
Private K-12 schools in the United States
Schools in Penobscot County, Maine
Private elementary schools in Maine
Private middle schools in Maine
Private high schools in Maine
1970 establishments in Maine
Educational institutions established in 1970
Educational buildings in Bangor, Maine